The Lindsay Muskies are a Junior "A" ice hockey team from Lindsay, Ontario, Canada.  They are a part of the Ontario Junior Hockey League.

History
The Muskies started out in the Central Junior C Hockey League.  In 1989, the team jumped to the Central Junior "B" and stayed with the league when it became the OPJHL in 1993.

Season-by-season results

Ownership
The Muskies were formally owned and operated by a group headed by Roger Neilson, former NHL Coach, and his estate.
In 2005, they were purchased by a group led by former NHL defenseman Jeff Beukeboom and Uxbridge, Ontario businessman Dave Knapp.

Clarence Schmalz Cup appearances
1964: Hespeler Shamrocks defeated Lindsay Muskies 4-games-to-1
1965: Simcoe Blades defeated Lindsay Muskies 4-games-to-1
1973: Caledonia Corvairs defeated Lindsay Muskies 4-games-to-1
1975: Essex 73's defeated Lindsay Muskies 4-games-to-3
1983: Dunnville Terriers defeated Lindsay Muskies 4-games-to-2

Notable alumni
Jason Arnott
Jeff Beukeboom
Kory Nagy (NHL Referee)
Bryan Young

References

External links
Lindsay Muskies

Ontario Provincial Junior A Hockey League teams
Kawartha Lakes